Calytrix drummondii is a species of plant in the myrtle family Myrtaceae that is endemic to Western Australia.

It blooms between November and January producing yellow star shaped flowers. The leaves are small, linear to oblong and taper to a fine point.

Found among woodlands and heath on sandplains in the Mid West and the northern Wheatbelt regions of Western Australia where it grows on sandy gravelly soils.

It is named for James Drummond who was a noted naturalist and botanical collector in Western Australia.

References

Plants described in 1987
drummondii
Flora of Western Australia